Amy Sheehan (born 26 October 1986) is an Australian freestyle skier. She competed at the FIS Freestyle World Ski Championships 2013 in Voss. In 2014, she competed at the Winter X Games XVIII in Aspen, and the 2014 Winter Olympics in Sochi, in women's halfpipe.

References 

1986 births
Living people
Freestyle skiers at the 2014 Winter Olympics
Australian female freestyle skiers
Olympic freestyle skiers of Australia